The 1977–78 Ranji Trophy was the 44th season of the Ranji Trophy. Karnataka won their second title defeating Uttar Pradesh.

Highlights
 Bombay finished third in the West Zone and failed to qualify for the knockout stage. Gujarat won all their four matches in the West Zone, a rare feat.
 Bombay were dismissed for 42 by Gujarat. This is their lowest total in Ranji Trophy.
 The loss against Gujarat ended a sequence of 124 matches without defeat for Bombay. Their previous defeat was against Baroda in 1957/58. During these twenty years, Bombay won the Ranji Trophy 18 times.
 Karnataka defeated Kerala without losing a wicket. Kerala scored 141 and 124, and Karnataka 451/0 decl. The partnership between Sanjay Desai and Roger Binny was then an Indian record for the first wicket.
 Rajinder Goel took 7 wickets for 4 runs in the second innings as Haryana bowled out Jammu Kashmir for 23. Goel's match figures were 13 for 29.

Group stage

South Zone

West Zone

North Zone

Central Zone

East Zone

Knockout stage

Final

Scorecards and averages
Cricketarchive

References

External links

1978 in Indian cricket
Ranji Trophy seasons
Domestic cricket competitions in 1977–78